Alagoasa is a genus of flea beetles in the family Chrysomelidae, containing some 140 species, found in the Neotropics.

Selected species

 Alagoasa angulosignata
 Alagoasa apicalis
 Alagoasa areata
 Alagoasa aurora
 Alagoasa bipunctata
 Alagoasa burmeisteri
 Alagoasa ceracollis
 Alagoasa coccinelloides
 Alagoasa condensa
 Alagoasa cruxnigra
 Alagoasa decemguttata
 Alagoasa dissepta
 Alagoasa fasciata
 Alagoasa jacobiana
 Alagoasa januaria
 Alagoasa scissa
 Alagoasa seriata
 Alagoasa vigintiseptemmaculata

References

Further reading

 

Alticini
Chrysomelidae genera